The onion chip is a deep fried snack made from onion.
Unlike potato chips, they are smellier and they have a strong flavor. Onion chips are used and sold as snacks but they can be used in different cuisines around the world. They can be cut and made in circle, square form and piece by piece. In Japanese cuisine, onion chips are used in some sushi.

See also

 Fried onion
 List of onion dishes

References

Snack foods
Onion-based foods
Deep fried foods